Satender Thakran (born 15 October 1993) is an Indian cricketer. He made his List A debut for Railways in the 2016–17 Vijay Hazare Trophy on 4 March 2017. He made his Twenty20 debut for Railways in the 2017–18 Zonal T20 League on 9 January 2018.

References

External links
 

1993 births
Living people
Indian cricketers
Railways cricketers
Place of birth missing (living people)